Smíchov is (since 1922) a district of Prague, the capital of the Czech Republic, and is part of Prague 5. It is on the west bank of the Vltava river.

History
It was only on 22 February 1903, that Smíchov was elevated to a city by imperial decision, and on 21 January 1904, Smíchov was granted a city coat of arms. In 1910 population of Smíchov was 51,791. After the first world war on the basis of the Act on Great Prague, Smíchov was attached to Great Prague in 1922 as part of its new urban district Prague XVI.

The Ringhoffer factory, founded in 1852 by railway magnate Baron Franz Ringhoffer (1817–1873) and nationalized after World War II, was part of one of the largest industrial enterprises of the Austro-Hungarian Empire (and later of Czechoslovakia). The Ringhoffer Works with more than 30,000 employees played a significant role in central European economy with global relevance, exporting railway carriages, cars (Tatra) and trucks across the world. The factory in Smíchov produced court trains and famous saloon cars for European rulers and after 1945 trams for the entire Eastern bloc. It was moved to Zličín in the 1990s and is now operated by Siemens. The buildings were demolished and replaced by a hypermarket, two multiplex cinemas, two hotels and several other commercial structures.

After the first world war the company based in Bohemia and Moravia hold strong positions in Czechoslovak heavy metal industries. Under occupation by Nazi Germany the "Ringhoffer-Tatra" concern, consisting of wagon, automobile and electro-technical factories principally in Prague-Smíchov and Studenka (wagon construction), Koprivnice (Tatra-automobiles), Kolin and Ceska Lipa, succeeded in holding together despite attempts of the Hermann-Göring-Werke to absorb it. This struggle required a certain level of cooperation with the authorities of the "Third Reich". Ringhoffer-Tatra was nationalized and dissolved after the liberation and restoration of Czechoslovakia in 1945. The last owner and general manager, Baron Hans (Hanus) Ringhoffer (1885–1946) died one year later in detention, the family was expelled without compensation.

Founder of the firm was the coppersmith and inventor Franz Ringhoffer (1744–1827), native of Müllendorf (nowadays in the Austrian province of Burgenland near the Hungarian border), who arrived in Prague in 1769. He set up his workshop in the Old Town and produced brewery pans besides distillery and agrarian technical equipment. His son Joseph (1785–1847) established a hammer mill in Kamenice and extended the business by adapting it to the manufacture of special products for sugar factories and distilleries. Joseph's son Franz (II) (1817–1873), the first Baron Ringhoffer, obtained by government decree a concession for the manufacture of all categories of metal work and machinery for the whole country. He perceived the opportunity offered by railway development and started in 1852 the production of vehicles in Smichov, where he added an iron-foundry. The Works became the largest rolling-stock factory in the former Austrian Empire and then in Czechoslovakia.

Between 1945 and 1989, the district contained a monument dedicated to Soviet tanks in World War II, which was located in Štefánik square. The monument was removed shortly after the Velvet Revolution and a new glass-and-steel building designed by French architect Jean Nouvel became a symbol of the district. An angel (anděl in Czech) from Wim Wenders' movie Wings of Desire is etched into the glass on the façade. The local traffic hub was renamed to Anděl from Moskevská (after Moscow). The Staropramen brewery is located in Smíchov.

Education

The Lycée Français de Prague, the French international school, is in Smíchov.

In popular culture
 1995 – an escalator scene from Svěrák's Kolya was shot in Smíchov. 
 1999 – Vladimír Michálek's movie Angel Exit featured among others the half built Jean Nouvel building, the abandoned Jewish synagogue, the half-demolished Ringhoffer factory, St Wenceslas Church and the Bertramka cemetery.
2009-now - Dollar Prync - hood hero, famous rapper , gipsy king

People
 Karl Egon Ebert, poet
 Moses Porges von Portheim, a Jewish mayor
  (1817–1873), baron, founder of the factory, mayor of Smíchov
 Ivan Puluj (1845–1918), an Ukrainian physicist and inventor, a professor (1884–1916) and a rector (1888–1889) of the Higher Technical School in Prague (German part)
 Rayko Daskalov (1886–1923), Bulgarian agrarian politician, was assassinated by an Internal Macedonian Revolutionary Organization (IMRO) associate in Smíchov
 Madeleine Albright, former United States Secretary of State (January 23, 1997 – January 20, 2001), first female to hold the post

See also
Dětský Island
Railway line Prague-Smíchov–Hostivice

References

 
Districts of Prague